Norman Arthur Ough (10 November 1898 – 3 August 1965) was a marine model maker whose models of Royal Navy warships are regarded as among the very finest of warship models.

Family and early life
Ough was born in Leytonstone, London. His father, Arthur Ough (1863–1946), was an architect, surveyor and civil engineer. At the age of two Ough accompanied his parents to Hong Kong, where his father was employed as an architect for the University of Hong Kong and the Kowloon-Canton Railway, remaining there for four years. He was educated at Highfield School, Liphook, Hampshire and Bootham School in York.

Later life
From the mid-1930s Ough lived in a flat at 98 Charing Cross Road, London. He never married and there is much anecdotal evidence that he lived a frugal, even impoverished, lifestyle in which model-making was a totally absorbing pursuit even to the extent of twice being hospitalised for failing to eat adequately due to concentration on his work.

Models
Many of Ough's models are on display or held in store in museums including the Imperial War Museum, the National Maritime Museum and the Royal United Services Museum. One of his earlier models was of the battleship HMS Queen Elizabeth, which he made for Lord Howe, who presented it to Earl Beatty. There followed commissions for his models from many museums. At one time he was employed by Earl Mountbatten to make models of ships on which he had served, who remarked in a reply dated 20 July 1979 to a letter received from a visitor to his Broadlands estate "How interesting that the great model maker, Norman Ough, was a cousin of yours... I was told by the maker of the model of HMS Hampshire, also on display, that other model makers considered Norman Ough, the greatest master of his craft of this century."

As at September 2017, these models were located at the collections and research facility at No. 1 Smithery, Chatham Historic Dockyard.

In an article written for an edition of the magazine Model Maker about his model of HMS Dorsetshire in No. 14 Dry Dock, Portsmouth, which is widely regarded as among his very best, Ough writes about the benefit of his early training as an artist in achieving the model's realism:

Plans
In preparation for his models, Ough drew meticulous plans of the ships, their weapons, fittings and boats, many of which are regarded as the most authoritative drawings of their subjects in existence. For years these plans were marketed through the David MacGregor Plans Service and after Ough's death in 1965 his plans became the sole property of David MacGregor. On MacGregor's death in 2003 the combined collection was bequeathed to the SS Great Britain Trust.

Film Industry work
Ough was commissioned to construct models for effects in several films including Convoy (1940), Sailors Three (1940), Spare a Copper (1940), Ships with Wings (1941), The Big Blockade (1942), San Demetrio London (1943) and Scott of the Antarctic (1948).

References

People from Leytonstone
Model engineers
Model makers
1898 births
1965 deaths